PEST may refer to:
 PEST analysis, framework used in strategic management
 PEST sequence, is a peptide sequence in proteins
 Specialized Unit for Special Tactics, special forces unit of the Slovenian Military Police

See also
Pest (disambiguation)